Chittagong Boat Club is a boat club in the port city of Chittagong, Bangladesh. Since 1986 it has provided several facilities for the elite to enjoy the club facilities as an offshore tourist spot.

Location

The Bangladesh Navy leased the land from the Chittagong Port Authority.

History

The club was inaugurated by former Chief of Naval Staff Sultan Ahmed on 8 August in 1990. In 2012, Chittagong Boat Club bought a river cruise ship from Western Marine Shipyard.

Governing body
The Chief of Bangladesh Naval Staff would be the President of the club, and then Commodore Commanding Bangladesh Navy Flotilla (COMBAN) would be the vice-president and later Commodore Commanding Chittagong (COMCHIT) became of Vice President for the club governing body.

Gallery

References

External links

Boating associations
1986 establishments in Bangladesh
Organizations established in 1986
Organisations based in Chittagong
Clubs and societies in Bangladesh
Tourist attractions in Chittagong Division
Culture in Chittagong